Mike Walker (born 4 April 1977) is a New Zealand sprint canoeist who competed in the late 2000s. He finished fifth in the K-2 1000 m event at the 2008 Summer Olympics in Beijing.

References

External links
 
 

1977 births
Canoeists at the 2008 Summer Olympics
Living people
New Zealand male canoeists
Olympic canoeists of New Zealand